Countdown to War is a television film made in 1989 as a co-production by Granada Television and PBS. It recounts the events that occurred between 15 March 1939, when the German army commanded by Adolf Hitler invaded Czechoslovakia and created the Protectorate of Bohemia and Moravia, and 3 September 1939, the date when France and United Kingdom declared war on Germany. The film is divided into 5 different stages: Mussolini's study, Hitler's Chancellery, Stalin's Kremlin, Beck’s bedroom, and Chamberlain's Cabinet. The script is based on private letters, diaries and records of meetings between the different leaders. The film starred Ian McKellen, Michael Aldridge, Alex Norton and Barrie Rutter.

Plot 
Europe's most powerful leaders desperately plot their strategies, attempting to determine the next moves of both their allies and enemies. The private meetings, arguments, anguish and personal battles will change the course of history. The Second World War is about to begin.

Cast 
 Ian McKellen - Adolf Hitler
 Michael Aldridge - Neville Chamberlain
 David Swift - Édouard Daladier
 Alex Norton - Joseph Stalin
 Barrie Rutter - Benito Mussolini
 John Woodvine - Joachim von Ribbentrop
 Peter Vaughan - Hermann Goering
 Michael Culver - Lord Halifax
 Michael Cronin - Vyacheslav Molotov
 James Laurenson - Galeazzo Ciano
 Bernard Gallagher - Arthur Greenwood
 Jonathan Coy - Rab Butler
 Ronnie Stevens - Eric Phipps
 Lee Montague - Leslie Hore-Belisha
 Tony Britton - Nevile Henderson
 Richard Heffer - Euan Wallace
 Robert Ashby - Georges-Étienne Bonnet
 Stephen Moore - Józef Beck
 Bill Stewart - Józef Lipski
 John Stratton - Emil Hácha
 Bob Sherman - William Cheristian Bullitt Jr.
 Michael Mellinger - Maurice Gamelin
 Anthony Bate - Sir John Simon
 Bernard Brown - Charles Corbin
 Hilary Minster - Birger Dahlerus

Availability 
A DVD of this film was released on 22 January 2008.

References

External links 
 
 

Films about Adolf Hitler
Biographical films about politicians
1989 films
American historical films
American World War II films
Cultural depictions of Winston Churchill
Cultural depictions of Neville Chamberlain
Cultural depictions of Joseph Stalin
Cultural depictions of Benito Mussolini
Cultural depictions of Hermann Göring
Films scored by Richard Harvey
1980s English-language films
1980s American films